Lara Alexandra Peake (born 4 August 1998) is an English actress.

Early life
From Nottingham, England, Peake did not go to drama school. At 12 Peake joined a drama workshop in Nottingham called the Inspire Academy.

Career
Peake had her initial breakthrough at the age of 15, when she was cast opposite George MacKay in Duane Hopkins' independent feature film Bypass. This earned her a spot on the 2015 longlist for the British Independent Film Awards ‘Most Promising Newcomer’. Peake has also filmed opposite Nicole Kidman and Elle Fanning in How To Talk To Girls at Parties adapted from a short story by fantasy writer Neil Gaiman.

She has a lead role in the coming of age movie Spaceship. She's aso appeared in Jo Brand's comedy vehicle Damned on Channel 4, and appeared in Tracey Ullman's Show on the BBC. Peake appeared in Channel 4 psychological thriller 4 part series Born to Kill.

Peake appeared in Final Score with Pierce Brosnan and Dave Bautista as a West Ham United fan who encounters terrorists during a match at the Boleyn Ground. Peake appeared in the Netflix series The English Game written by Julian Fellowes about the birth of professionalism in association football in Victorian England. Peake has the role of Madysun in Brave New World.

Filmography

Film

Television

References

1998 births
Living people
Actresses from Nottinghamshire
Actors from Nottingham